Khaveh (also Romanized as Khāveh and Khāweh; also known as Ḩāveh) is a village in Jushaq Rural District, in the Central District of Delijan County, Markazi Province, Iran. At the 2006 census, its population was 963, in 306 families.

References 

Populated places in Delijan County